Two shore establishments of the Royal Navy have borne the name HMS Ferret:

 was the Royal Navy's Londonderry base during the Second World War, established in 1940 and closed in 1947, becoming HMS Sea Eagle.
 is a training unit of the Royal Naval Reserve established in 1983 and currently active.

See also

Royal Navy ship names